Rosetta Calavetta (27 August 1914 – 3 February 1993) was an Italian actress and voice actress.

Biography
Born in Palermo, Calavetta made her breakthrough role as a teenager in the 1930 film Before the Jury in which she had a small role. She performed on screen several times from then until 1940. She also did her share of acting for the EIAR from 1937 to 1938.

Calavetta also possessed a popular reputation as a voice dubber. She was the official Italian voice of Lana Turner, Marilyn Monroe and Doris Day. Other actresses she dubbed included Lois Maxwell, Eleanor Parker, Susan Hayward, Dorothy Lamour, Ava Gardner, Veronica Lake, Kim Novak, Deanna Durbin, Glynis Johns, Jean Arthur, Shirley MacLaine, Angela Lansbury, Janet Leigh, June Allyson, Lucille Ball, Zsa Zsa Gábor and Ann Sheridan. She also dubbed Italian actresses which include Gina Lollobrigida, Antonella Lualdi, María Mercader, Silvana Pampanini and Milly Vitale.

In Calavetta's Italian dubbed animated roles, she provided the speaking voice of Snow White in Snow White and the Seven Dwarfs as well as Cruella de Vil in One Hundred and One Dalmatians and Darling in Lady and the Tramp.

Death
Calavetta died on 3 February 1993 in Rome at the age of 78.

In the sixtieth anniversary of the Marilyn Monroe's death, the memory of the colleagues of Rosetta Calavetta, the Sicilian actress who dubbed her in Italian.

Filmography

Cinema
Before the Jury (1930)
The Blue Fleet (1932)
The Ambassador (1936)
Marionette (1939)
Vento di milioni (1940)

Dubbing roles

Animation
Snow White in Snow White and the Seven Dwarfs
Cruella de Vil in One Hundred and One Dalmatians
Darling in Lady and the Tramp
Drizella in Cinderella
Marionette in Pinocchio
Kanga in Winnie the Pooh and the Honey Tree
Kanga in Winnie the Pooh and the Blustery Day

Live action
Rosemary Howard in Bachelor in Paradise
Milady, Countess de Winter in The Three Musketeers
Maggie Colby in The Lady Takes a Flyer
Shelia Cabot in Portrait in Black
Beatrix Emery in Dr. Jekyll and Mr. Hyde
Elsa Keller in The Sea Chase
Melanie Flood in Who's Got the Action?
Cora Smith in The Postman Always Rings Twice
Bunny Smith in Week-End at the Waldorf
Peggy Evans in Slightly Dangerous
Sugar "Kane" Kowalczyk in Some Like It Hot
Pola Debevoise in How to Marry a Millionaire
Peggy in Clash by Night
Chérie in Bus Stop
Rose Loomis in Niagara
Roslyn Tabor in The Misfits
Kay Weston in River of No Return
Elsie Marina in The Prince and the Showgirl
Amanda Dell in Let's Make Love
Grunion's Client in Love Happy
Nanette Carter in Tea for Two
Laurie Tuttle in Young at Heart
Melinda Howard in Lullaby of Broadway
Jan Morrow in Pillow Talk
Beverly Boyer in The Thrill of It All
Jo Jordan in Young Man with a Horn
Cathy Timberlake in That Touch of Mink
Calamity Jane in Calamity Jane
Carol Templeton in Lover Come Back
Jane Osgood in It Happened to Jane
Winifred Banks in Mary Poppins
Marion Crane in Psycho
Miss Moneypenny in Dr. No
Miss Moneypenny in From Russia with Love
Miss Moneypenny in Thunderball
Miss Moneypenny in You Only Live Twice
Miss Moneypenny in On Her Majesty's Secret Service
Clarissa Saunders in Mr. Smith Goes to Washington
Baroness Bomburst in Chitty Chitty Bang Bang
Ilonka Tolnay in Spring Parade

References

External links
 
 
 

1914 births
1993 deaths
Actresses from Palermo
Italian voice actresses
Italian radio actresses
Italian film actresses
20th-century Italian actresses